To Die like a Man is a 2009 Portuguese drama film directed by João Pedro Rodrigues, produced by the production company Rosa Filmes.

Cast
In order of appearance: 
 Chandra Malatitch as Zé Maria
 John Romão as Mendes
 Ivo Barroso as Cardoso
 Gonçalo Ferreira de Almeida as Maria Bakker
 Miguel Loureiro as Paula
 Francisco Peres as the Plastic Surgeon
 Fernando Santos as Tonia
 Cindy Scrash as Irene
 Carloto Cotta as Carlos
 Jenny Larrue as Jenny
 Gonçalo Mendes as Sérgio
 Alexander David as Rosário
 Fernando Gomes as Teixeira
 André Murraças as Dr. Felgueiras
 Amândio Coroado as the Hospital Doctor
 Marco Paiva as the Nurse

Awards and nominations
It competed in the Un Certain Regard section at the 2009 Cannes Film Festival. It was selected as the Portuguese entry for the Best Foreign Language Film at the 83rd Academy Awards but it didn't make the final shortlist.

Critical reception
Critical reception has been mixed. Variety.com's Leslie Felperin stated that he disliked the film's excessive running time (138'), that too much of the time is taken up by music and singing, feeling that the movie and storyline were unremarkable. However, the movie was voted "Best Undistributed Film" of 2009 in the Village Voice's 10th Annual Film Critics' Poll. "A fabulously sad fable about a Fado-singing, pooch-pampering trannie growing old, [To Die Like a Man] is also a piece of lyrical, playful, unpredictable filmmaking," wrote film critic J. Hoberman. The film seventh on Cahiers du cinémas list of the best films of 2010. Keith Uhlich of Time Out New York named To Die Like a Man the seventh-best film of 2011, calling it a "quiet heartbreaker."

See also
 List of submissions to the 83rd Academy Awards for Best Foreign Language Film
 List of Portuguese submissions for the Academy Award for Best Foreign Language Film

References

External links
 To Die Like a Man official page at Rosa Filmes web site (click on "ENG", then on "ABOUT US", then on "FILMS", then on "TO DIE LIKE A MAN")

2009 films
2009 drama films
Portuguese LGBT-related films
2000s Portuguese-language films
Films directed by João Pedro Rodrigues
2009 LGBT-related films
LGBT-related drama films